Musevi is a bridge to celebrate the bicentenary of the independence of Mexico; it is located in the city of Villahermosa, Tabasco, on the side of the lake of "Las Illusiones" and Tomas Garrido Park. It has a museum of regional artists and a coffee shop on the top of the bridge. It crosses the Paseo Tabsco avenue.

Attractions
1- Musevi
2- Amphitheater
3- Sound and light show
4- Playground
5- Earth Museum
6- Gourmet zone

References

External links
 www.Villahermosa.gob.mx
 MUSEVI / TEN Arquitectos

Villahermosa
Bridges in Mexico